Xenosaurus  rackhami, Rackham's knob-scaled lizard, is a lizard found in Mexico and Guatemala.

References

Xenosauridae
Reptiles described in 1941
Reptiles of Mexico
Reptiles of Guatemala
Taxa named by Laurence Cooper Stuart